FK Belasica is a football club based in the city of Strumica, North Macedonia. They are currently competing in the Macedonian Second League.

History
The club was founded on 22 April 1922 at the cafe of Tašo Todorov, where fifty initiators gathered at the founding meeting for the football club Belasica Strumica. According to documents, the first meeting was held on 13 August 1922 with Gjorgi Moskov elected president, Tomi Kujundziev as secretary and Rosto Perov as treasurer.The first match played in club history was against Pobeda from Skopje, where Belasica lost by the score of 1–0.

Their popular Nickname is Kangaroos and their best period was the golden 80s when they won the Macedonian championship twice.
For the most part the team played in the Federal Second league Mainly the teams from 6 federal Republics.Everybody in Macedonia remembers  some old legends such as Blagoj Istatov and Vasil Ringov.Belasica was also known as Belasica GC (GC for Geras Cunev) as Geras Cunev was the main sponsor for many years. In Macedonian top league, the club had its latest success was the early 2000s when they were runners-up of the Macedonian First League twice. In the year 2018 they came back to the First League and Belasica plays an important role in Macedonian football providing countless source of football talent. The North Macedonia national football team  had many players that came from the Belasica youth school. Among them are: Goran Pandev, Aco Stojkov, Dragan Stojkov, Igor Gjuzelov, Robert Popov, Goran Popov, Zoran Baldovaliev, Dancho Masev and Goran Maznov.

In 2015, the club was bought by the Macedonian kickboxer Slavcho Vaskov-Pinda.

The most notable player to come out of Belasica is Goran Pandev a current Macedonian international and Genoa player.

Club Titles
 Macedonian Champions (4) :
 1956,1958,1983,1988
 Macedonian Cup  (2):
 1984,1986

Belasica's stadium 

Mladost Stadium is a multi-purpose stadium in Strumica, Republic of North Macedonia. It is currently used mostly for football matches and the stadium's capacity is 6,500 spectators. With the last reconstruction in 2017 the stadium has a capacity of 9,200 seats, and it is a third-class field in accordance with UEFA standards. It meets the conditions for a high-ranking competition and is the second such stadium in the country.

Recent seasons

1The 2019–20 season was abandoned due to the COVID-19 pandemic in North Macedonia.

Belasica in Europe

Players

Current squad
As of 23 February 2023.

Historical list of coaches

 Nikola Ilievski (1993 - 1994)
 Blagoje Istatov
 Dragi Kanatlarovski (1996)
 Ilija Matenicarov (1999 - 2000)
 Nikola Ilievski (2000)
 Trajce Georgiev (2001)
 Nikola Sekulov (2001)
 Riste Ancev (16 Nov 2001 -)
 Ilija Matenicarov
 Pane Blazevski (9 Apr 2003 -) 
 Miroslav Jakovljević (2004 - Sep 2005)
 Šefki Arifovski (30 Sep 2005 - Dec 2005)
 Zvonko Todorov (15 Dec 2005 - 2006)
 Jugoslav Trencovski (15 Sep 2007 - 15 Jul 2009)
 Milko Ǵurovski (15 Jul 2009 - 4 Jan 2010)
 Gordan Zdravkov (2010 - 2011)
 Rade Cicmilovikj (1 Aug 2016 - 30 Jul 2018)
 Marjan Živković (31 Jul 2018 - 3 Dec 2018)
 Rade Cicmilovikj (4 Dec 2018 - 22 Mar 2019)
 Gjoko Hadžievski (23 Mar 2019 - 15 Apr 2019)
 Aleksandar Stojanov (18 Apr 2019 -)
 Blagoj Gucev (  -)

References

External links
Official Website 
Club info at MacedonianFootball 
Football Federation of Macedonia 

 
Football clubs in North Macedonia
Football clubs in Yugoslavia
Association football clubs established in 1922
1922 establishments in Yugoslavia